Charles Cyril Clarke (22 December 1910 – 6 November 1997)  was an English cricketer who played first-class cricket for  Derbyshire  from 1929 to 1933 and for Sussex in 1947.

Clarke was born at Burton-on-Trent, Staffordshire. He made his debut for Derbyshire against Lancashire in July 1929, but played little part as the match was abandoned as a draw. He played three more matches that year and for the next four years played about 5 matches in consecutive sets each year, either in May or August. From 1935 until the Second World War, he played minor county cricket for Staffordshire. During the war he played a match for Southern Command against the Royal Army Service Corps. He played in the second XI for Sussex in 1946 and in 1947 played three first-class matches for Sussex in which his batting average was 6.2. Clarke was a right-hand batsman and played 43 innings in 28 first-class matches with an average of 11.80 and a top score of 35 not out.

Clarke moved to Kendal where he played and coached. He earned the nickname "the Conjuror", because he was magic on the field. Later he ran  a white-elephant shop.

Clarke died at  Carnforth, Lancashire at the age of 86.

References

1910 births
1997 deaths
Derbyshire cricketers
Sussex cricketers
English cricketers
Staffordshire cricketers
Sportspeople from Burton upon Trent
British Army personnel of World War II
British Army soldiers
Military personnel from Staffordshire